The Concerto for Horn and Strings is a concerto for horn and string orchestra in three movements by the English composer Gordon Jacob.  The work was composed in 1951 for soloist Dennis Brain and premiered on 8 May 1951, with Jacob conducting the Riddick String Orchestra in Wigmore Hall, London.  The piece has been regarded as one of the most popular horn concertos of the 20th century.

Structure
The work has a duration of roughly 25 minutes and is composed in three movements:
Allegro moderato
Adagio molto
Allegro con spirito, quasi presto

Reception
Reviewing its world premiere, The Musical Times wrote, "It is music designed for entertainment rather than edification, thrown off with the sure, light touch of a master craftsman, but though it in no way taxes the listener, it makes phenomenal demands on the soloist."  In 2007, Andrew McGregor of the BBC also praised the concerto, writing:

See also
List of compositions for horn

References

Compositions by Gordon Jacob
Jacob
1951 compositions
20th-century classical music